Shchekino is a rural locality (a village) in Tregubovskoye Rural Settlement, Velikoustyugsky District, Vologda Oblast, Russia. The population was 128 as of 2002. There are 3 streets.

Geography 
Shchekino is located 20 km southwest of Veliky Ustyug (the district's administrative centre) by road. Starkovo is the nearest rural locality.

References 

Rural localities in Velikoustyugsky District